Roberto Muñoz Rodríguez (February 5, 1941 – September 24, 2012) was a Venezuelan professional baseball pitcher. He played in Major League Baseball (MLB) for the Kansas City / Oakland Athletics, San Diego Padres, and Chicago Cubs. He played in the United States under the name of Roberto Rodriguez.

Born in Caracas, Rodríguez carried a varied repertoire that relied on intelligence over raw explosiveness. He had a variable-speed fastball (reaching 90 MPH), a slider, a tough curveball, and a circle change-up as his most effective offering.

Once considered one of the best prospects in the Kansas City Athletics minor league system, he also pitched for the San Diego Padres and Chicago Cubs organizations.

Rodríguez was signed by the Athletics as an amateur free agent in 1963, spending seven minor league seasons from 1964–1970. He posted a 42–28 record and a 3.15 earned run average in 124 pitching appearances before being promoted to the big team in May 1967. He returned to the minors in early June and was recalled two months later.

He went 1–1 with a 3.57 ERA and two saves in 15 games (five starts). On August 27, he earned his first and only major league victory against the Detroit Tigers, 2–1, allowing four hits to a powerful lineup that included Norm Cash, Bill Freehan, Al Kaline, Dick McAuliffe, Eddie Mathews and Jim Northrup.

After that, Rodríguez would remain in the organization after the team was renamed the Oakland Athletics in 1968. He returned to the majors in 1970, pitching for the Athletics, Padres and Cubs in the same season. He later played three Triple-A seasons with the Tacoma Cubs and the Wichita Aeros from 1971 through 1974.

In a three-season career, he compiled a 4–3 record with a 4.81 ERA and seven saves in 57 games. Over the course of his 11-year minor league career from 1964–1974, he went 61–43 with a 3.60 ERA in 904 games.

In addition, Rodríguez played in the Venezuelan Professional Baseball League during 17 seasons (1961–62/1978–79). ″Pluto″, as his teammates nicknamed him, went 64–49 with a 3.04 ERA  and 59 saves in 168 games (97 starts), to become the first pitcher in VPBL history to top both 50 wins and 50 saves. The mark was later matched by Luis Aponte (1973–74/1996–97) and Giovanni Carrara (1990–91/2009–10).

After retiring he worked as a pitching coach in his Venezuelan homeland. He also served as an instructor in the baseball academy operated by Carlos Guillén in Maracay. In 2011, he gained induction into the Venezuelan Baseball Hall of Fame.

Rodríguez died in Maracay in 2012, at the age of 71, after suffering a heart failure.

See also
 List of players from Venezuela in Major League Baseball

References

External links
, or Retrosheet, or Venezuelan Winter League

1941 births
2012 deaths
Burlington Bees players
Cardenales de Lara players
Chicago Cubs players
Daytona Beach Islanders players
Industriales de Valencia players
Iowa Oaks players
Kansas City Athletics players
Lewiston Broncs players
Leones del Caracas players
Llaneros de Acarigua players
Major League Baseball pitchers
Major League Baseball players from Venezuela
Navegantes del Magallanes players
Oakland Athletics players
Baseball players from Caracas
Sportspeople from Maracay
San Diego Padres players
Tacoma Cubs players
Tigres de Aragua players
Vancouver Mounties players
Venezuelan expatriate baseball players in Canada
Venezuelan expatriate baseball players in the United States
Wichita Aeros players